Nahr-e Mian Rural District is a rural district (dehestan) in Zalian District, Shazand County, Markazi Province, Iran. At the 2006 census, its population was 9,741, in 2,401 families. The rural district has 20 villages.

References 

Rural Districts of Markazi Province
Shazand County